Hydraulic hammer may refer to:

Breaker (hydraulic), a percussion hammer fitted to an excavator for demolishing concrete structures or rocks
Hydraulic hammer, a type of piling hammer